is a town located in  Hashima District, Gifu, Japan. , the town had an estimated population of 25,661 and a population density of 3200 persons per km2, in 10,633 households.

Geography
Ginan is located in the Nōbi Plain in southern Gifu Prefecture, bordering on Aichi Prefecture. The Kiso River and the Sakai River flow through the town, which is located in marshy flatlands and was often subject to flooding.  The town has a climate characterized by characterized by hot and humid summers, and mild winters  (Köppen climate classification Cfa).  The average annual temperature in Ginan is 15.6 °C. The average annual rainfall is 1934 mm with September as the wettest month. The temperatures are highest on average in August, at around 28.1 °C, and lowest in January, at around 4.1 °C.

Neighbouring municipalities
Gifu Prefecture
Gifu
Kakamigahara
Kasamatsu
Aichi Prefecture
Ichinomiya

Demographics
Per Japanese census data, the population of Ginan nearly doubled between 1970 and 1990, although growth has slowed since then.

History
The area around Ginan was part of traditional Owari Province until the course of the Kiso River shifted in 1586, after which time it was part of Mino Province. It was an ancient settlement on the important river crossing connecting Nagoya with Gifu.  During the Edo period, it was divided between territory controlled by Owari Domain and various small  hatamoto holdings.  During the post-Meiji restoration cadastral reforms, the area was organised into Haguri District, Gifu Prefecture, which was subsequently transferred to Hashima District, Gifu. The modern village of Ginan was formed on September 26, 1956 by the merger of the villages of Yatsuru and Kamiheguri. It was elevated to town status four days later on October 1, 1956. Plans to merge with the neighbouring city of Gifu were rejected by a referendum in June 2004.

Economy
The mainstay of the local economy is agriculture (rice, vegetables, dairy, poultry), and light industry  (computer related products, dairy products, chemicals).

Education
Ginan has three public elementary schools and one public middle school operated by the town government. The one high school in town is a private girls high school.

Transportation

Railway
 Meitetsu - Nagoya Main Line

Highway
 Tōkai-Hokuriku Expressway

References

External links

 

 
Towns in Gifu Prefecture